Rusk County Airport may refer to:

 Rusk County Airport (Texas), in Henderson, Texas, United States (FAA/IATA: RFI)
 Rusk County Airport (Wisconsin), in Ladysmith, Wisconsin, United States (FAA/IATA: RCX)